Przybysławice  is a village in the administrative district of Gmina Gołcza, within Miechów County, Lesser Poland Voivodeship, in southern Poland.

The village has a population of 345.

References

Villages in Miechów County